In enzymology, an α-pinene-oxide decyclase is an enzyme that catalyzes the chemical reaction

α-pinene oxide  (Z)-2-methyl-5-isopropylhexa-2,5-dienal

Hence, this enzyme has one substrate, α-pinene oxide, and one product, (Z)-2-methyl-5-isopropylhexa-2,5-dienal.

This enzyme belongs to the family of isomerases, specifically the class of intramolecular lyases.  The systematic name of this enzyme class is α-pinene-oxide lyase (decyclizing). This enzyme is also called α-pinene oxide lyase.  This enzyme participates in limonene and pinene degradation.

References

 

EC 5.5.1
Enzymes of unknown structure